"Be My Twin" is a song by British boyband Brother Beyond, written by band members Carl Fysh and David White. Released on 9 January 1989, the single reached  14 on the UK Singles Chart and No. 13 on the Irish Singles Chart.

Background
Brother Beyond's album Get Even (from which the track is taken) had been released in Japan by the time the single was issued. It was repackaged for its release in the rest of the world, including the two Stock Aitken & Waterman-produced tracks, and omitting two of the band's self-penned songs from the original release.

Music video
The music video was filmed in Hong Kong with the concept that each band member has a twin.

Track listings
7-inch single
A. "Be My Twin"
B. "Broken Life"

UK 12-inch single
A1. "Be My Twin" (extended)
B1. "Broken Life"
B2. "Be My Twin" (instrumental)

UK CD single
 "Be My Twin"
 "Broken Life"
 "Be My Twin" (extended)

US 12-inch single
A1. "Be My Twin" (extended mix) – 6:35
A2. "Broken Life" – 3:48
B1. "Be My Twin" (12-inch vocal club mix) – 7:10
B2. "Be My Twin" (Devotion dub) – 7:37

Charts

References

1989 singles
1988 songs
Brother Beyond songs
Parlophone singles